Qual é o Seu Talento? (English: What's Your Talent?), often shortened to QST?, was a Brazilian reality television series  on the SBT, a modern version of Show de Calouros created by Silvio Santos in the 1970s.

Former MTV Brasil VJ André Vasco is the show's main host and the judging panel consisted of Thomas Roth, Arnaldo Saccomani, Carlos Eduardo Miranda and Cyz Zamorano (the same four from the first two seasons of Ídolos Brazil). On June 23, 2010, season 2 fourth-place finisher Laura Fontana, the "Baby Lady Gaga", joins the cast as the show's backstage interviewer.

On the show, singers, dancers, magicians, comedians, variety acts, and other performers of all ages compete against each other for the advertised top prize. Among its significant features were that it gave an opportunity to talented amateurs or unknown performers, with the results decided by the judges vote.

Cast members

Selection process

Auditions
Before the auditions in front of the judges are held, there are separate untelevised producers' auditions which come to various cities across Brazil. Only 130–180 contestants per season advanced to the São Paulo Round.

São Paulo Round
For the São Paulo round, each of the four judges has two buttons in front of them. At the end of the act, each judge must to vote, pressing one of the buttons: a red :( or a green :). Contestants who took one or more red votes would be automatically eliminated, while contestants who took all green votes would gets through to the semi-finals.

Semi-finals
There were five–six semifinals, each with seven–nine contestants. Judges voted with the same criterion: contestants who took one or more red :( votes would be automatically eliminated, while contestants who took all green :) votes would return at the end of the episode for the judges to decide who would go to the final.

Wild Card
In season 1, eleven contestants who took all green votes on the semifinals but failed to make it to the final were invited back to the show. In the end, lyrical singer Márcio Sena was chosen by the judges as the sixth and final member of the final six, where it eventually would be in fifth place.

Season chronology

Ratings

Brazilian ratings

 Each point represents 60.000 households in São Paulo.

References

External links
 Qual é o Seu Talento? website

 
Brazilian reality television series